Nevil Thanas Dede (born 10 January 1975) is an Albanian professional football coach and former player.

A centre-back, Dede spent most of his club career with his hometown club Tirana, winning a string of trophies, including 8 championships, being one of the most decorated players.

Dede has also been an Albanian international, representing Albania in 30 matches. He was also named Albanian Footballer of the Year in 2006.

After retiring early on in the 2009–10 season, Dede was appointed assistant manager of Tirana. Since then, Dede did not settle any teams, managing in quick succession Laçi, Tirana once again, Luftëtari and Kastrioti and Albania U19 women where he was the inaugural head coach. In 2018, after one year four years without managing a club, he was named new manager of Dinamo Tirana.

Club career
He has played for KF Tirana since 1994 until 2008, except for the years 2004–2006 when he played for Elbasani. Dede also had a short spell in China in 2008 with Changsha.

Dede was one of the most important individuals in the Elbasani squad that clinched Albanian Superliga title in the 2005–06 season. He played 33 matches and scored 5 goals, and was rewarded with Albanian Footballer of the Year award for his performances.

Dede announced his retirement from the sport in September 2009 due to injuries.

International career
Dede made his debut for the Albania national team in 1995, and has been capped 30 times.

Managerial career

Tirana
In October 2009, after retiring in the previous month, Dede was appointet assistant manager of Alban Tafaj at Tirana. His spell was short-lived however, as he left the club in February of the following year after falling out with Tafaj.

Tirana return
On 10 October 2010, Dede was renamed manager of Tirana for the remainder of the season, replacing the departed Sulejman Starova. He was presented to the media in the next day.

Erzeni
On 10 January 2018, Dede was named the manager of Kategoria e Parë side Erzeni; he was presented on the same day. However, after less than two weeks, Dede announced to have left the team, citing the distant distance from Tirana as the main reason.

Career statistics

Club

International

Honours

Club
Tirana
Kategoria Superiore:(8) 1994–95, 1995–96, 1996–97, 1998–99, 1999–2000, 2002–03, 2003–04, 2006–07
Albanian Cup:(5) 1993–94, 1995–96, 1998–99, 2000–01, 2001–02
Albanian Supercup:(6) 1994, 2000, 2002, 2003, 2006, 2009

Elbasani
Kategoria Superiore: 2005–06

Individual
Albanian Footballer of the Year: 2006

References

External links

1975 births
Living people
Footballers from Tirana
Albanian footballers
Association football defenders
Albania international footballers
KF Tirana players
KF Elbasani players
Changsha Ginde players
Albanian expatriate footballers
Expatriate footballers in China
Albanian expatriate sportspeople in China
Chinese Super League players
Albanian football managers
KF Laçi managers
Luftëtari Gjirokastër managers
KF Tirana managers
KS Kastrioti managers
Kategoria Superiore players
Kategoria Superiore managers